The 1993 PBA Commissioner's Cup Finals was the best-of-7 championship series of the 1993 PBA Commissioner's Cup, and the conclusion of the conference playoffs. Corporate rivals Purefoods and Swift played in the finals for the second time in two years and for the 55th championship contested by the league.

Swift Mighty Meaty Hotdogs wins their 2nd PBA title with a 4-2 series victory against the Purefoods Oodles.

Qualification

Series scoring summary

Games summary

Game 1

Swift looks headed for a runaway victory when they led by 17 points, 80-63, halfway in the fourth quarter. Alvin Patrimonio ignited a rally for the Oodles, his three-point play off Ronnie Thompkins pull them within six at 81-87. Five straight points by Al Solis which started with a triple starved off the Oodles' rallies even as Patrimonio answered with his own triple to cut the lead of the Meaties again to six, 86-92. The Oodles failed to execute on their next play in a last attempt to close the gap.

Game 2

In an amazing display of offensive power, Purefoods Oodles' hot-shooting and near-perfect field goal at the start of the fourth quarter blew the game wide open as they leads by as much as 29 points. Down 49-56 early in the third quarter, a 14-4 blast gave the Oodles a 63-60 lead, after a timeout by Swift and a basket, another run by Purefoods saw them led 79-65 after three quarters. Ronnie Thompkins open the fourth period with a basket but the Ooodles countered with a 12-0 bomb to put the game away, 91-67.

Game 3

Swift import Ronnie Thompkins went to work early as the Meaties surge to a 30-9 lead in the first quarter, the closest the Oodles came within was three, 77-80 in the fourth quarter. Al Solis' triple gave Swift an 85-78 lead and Ronnie Thompkins' follow-up dunk completed an 8-1 run to give them a 10-point advantage, 88-78.

Game 4

After uneventful first two quarters, Vergel Meneses took charge in the second half, a three-point play started a run that gave Swift an 83-74 lead with less than a minute remaining in the third quarter. The Meaties were up by 11 points in the final period, the last at 103-92 when an 8-0 blast by Purefoods with two triples put them to within three, 103-100, a series of miscues, hurried shots and errors by the Oodles resulted to Swift countering with a 7-0 run that ice the ballgame at 110-100.

Game 5

From a 59-58 halftime score in favor of the Oodles, a basket by Swift turned out to be their last taste of the lead for the night, an 11-0 blast by the Oodles gave them a 10-point advantage. Purefoods went up by 21 points late in the third quarter, 98-77 on a three-point play by Ronnie Grandison. The Meaties came closest at 89-102 when Glenn Capacio converted on a triple as the Oodles scored on every opportunity to extend the series to a sixth game.

Game 6

The series-clinching win was a see-saw battle, it was close for the last time at 87-86 in favor of Swift. After a timeout, the Meaties scored six straight points for a 93-86 lead. Going into the final minutes with the score at 95-91 for Swift, Jerry Codinera was fouled and poked in the eye by Rudy Distrito. Affected by his vision, Codinera missed two crucial free throws. In a breakaway run, Rudy Distrito converted on a basket and a deliberate foul from Dindo Pumaren, who was also poked in the eye by Distrito. With a bonus free throw plus ball possession, the Meaties were up by seven and Nelson Asaytono scored on a follow-up to give them a 100-91 lead for good.

Rosters

Broadcast notes

References

External links
PBA official website

1993 PBA season
1993
Pop Cola Panthers games
Magnolia Hotshots games
PBA Commissioner's Cup Finals
Pba